Mattia Viviani (born 4 September 2000) is an Italian football player. He plays for Benevento.

Club career
He is the product of Brescia youth teams. On 22 March 2018, he signed his first professional contract with Brescia at the age of 17 for a three-year term.

Two days later, on 24 March 2018, he made his Serie B debut for Brescia in a game against Bari as a starter, before being substituted at half-time by Andrea Caracciolo.

On 14 December 2019 he did his Serie A debut against Lecce.

On 5 October 2020 he signed a three-year contract with Chievo. Chievo went bankrupt at the end of the 2020–21 season, making him a free agent.

On 15 September 2021, Viviani signed with Benevento.

International
In September 2018, he was called up to Italy national under-19 football team for two friendlies.

References

External links
 

2000 births
Living people
Footballers from Brescia
Italian footballers
Italy youth international footballers
Association football midfielders
Brescia Calcio players
A.C. ChievoVerona players
Benevento Calcio players
Serie A players
Serie B players